The 1968 Cincinnati Reds season was a season in American baseball. It consisted of the Reds finishing in fourth in the National League, with a record of 83–79, 14 games behind the St. Louis Cardinals. The Reds were managed by Dave Bristol and played their home games at Crosley Field. The team had 5,767 at bats, a single season National League record. The Reds as a team led all of MLB this season in runs scored (690) and in batting average (.273).

Offseason 
 November 28, 1967: Clyde Mashore was drafted from the Reds by the New York Mets in the 1967 rule 5 draft.
 November 29, 1967: Sammy Ellis was traded by the Reds to the California Angels for Bill Kelso and Jorge Rubio.
 January 27, 1968: Chris Chambliss was drafted by the Reds in the 2nd round of the secondary phase of the 1968 Major League Baseball draft, but did not sign.
 February 8, 1968: Johnny Edwards was traded by the Reds to the St. Louis Cardinals for Jimy Williams and Pat Corrales.
 March 28, 1968: Clyde Mashore was returned to the Reds by the New York Mets.

Regular season 
Catcher Johnny Bench won the NL's Rookie of the Year Award.

Season standings

Record vs. opponents

Roster

Player stats

Batting

Starters by position 
Note: Pos = Position; G = Games played; AB = At bats; H = Hits; Avg. = Batting average; HR = Home runs; RBI = Runs batted in

Other batters 
Note: G = Games played; AB = At bats; H = Hits; Avg. = Batting average; HR = Home runs; RBI = Runs batted in

Pitching

Starting pitchers 
Note: G = Games pitched; IP = Innings pitched; W = Wins; L = Losses; ERA = Earned run average; SO = Strikeouts

Other pitchers 
Note: G = Games pitched; IP = Innings pitched; W = Wins; L = Losses; ERA = Earned run average; SO = Strikeouts

Relief pitchers 
Note: G = Games pitched; W = Wins; L = Losses; SV = Saves; ERA = Earned run average; SO = Strikeouts

Awards and honors 
Pete Rose, Hutch Award

Farm system 

LEAGUE CHAMPIONS: Asheville

Notes

References 
1968 Cincinnati Reds season at Baseball Reference

Cincinnati Reds seasons
Cincinnati Reds season
Cincinnati Reds